Sugar Grove Township is the name of some places in the U.S. state of Pennsylvania:

Sugar Grove Township, Mercer County, Pennsylvania
Sugar Grove Township, Warren County, Pennsylvania

Pennsylvania township disambiguation pages